Donald Fry may refer to:

 Donald C. Fry (born 1955), American politician
 Donald K. Fry (born 1937), American writer and scholar
 Don Fry, Australian engineer, entrepreneur and philanthropist

See also 
 Don Frye (born 1965), American mixed martial artist